Sila Nerangalil Sila Manithargal is a Tamil-language novel by Jayakanthan. It is an expanded version of his 1968 short story Agnipravesam with a different ending. The novel, serialised in 1970 in Dinamani Kathir, won the Sahitya Akademi Award in 1972. A sequel titled Gangai Enge Pogiral was published in 1978. The novel was translated into Malayalam as Chila Samayangalil Chila Manushyar by C. A. Balan. It was adapted into a Tamil feature film by the same name (1977), and a Malayalam television series Chila Nerangalil Chila Manushyar (2011).

Plot

Overview 
Agnipravesam, a short story written by Jayakanthan, was published in the magazine Ananda Vikatan in 1968. The ending of the story, where a chaste woman purifies her daughter (by pouring a bucket of water on her) for having sex with a stranger, forgives her and asks her to move on, gained significant attention for deviating from cultural norms, and many readers suggested alternate ways to end the story in an "acceptable" manner. Responding to those suggestions, Jayakanthan expanded the short story into a full-fledged novel Sila Nerangalil Sila Manithargal with a different ending. He also took inspiration from his personal experiences.

Accolades 
Sila Nerangalil Sila Manithargal won the Sahitya Akademi Award in 1972.

Sequel 
Gangai Enge Pogiral, a sequel novel, was published in 1978. The novel revolves around Ganga being rehabilitated and becoming more responsible.

Adaptations 
Sila Nerangalil Sila Manithargal was adapted into a Tamil feature film by the same name in 1977, again written by Jayakanthan. In 2011, the novel was adapted into a Malayalam television series Chila Nerangalil Chila Manushyar.

References 

1970 novels
Indian novels adapted into films
Indian romance novels
Novels first published in serial form
Novels set in Tamil Nadu
Tamil novels